Staraya Kuzva is a rural locality (a village) in Beloyevskoye Rural Settlement, Kudymkarsky District, Perm Krai, Russia. The population was 16 as of 2010.

Geography 
Staraya Kuzva is located 37 km west of Kudymkar (the district's administrative centre) by road. Alexandrova is the nearest rural locality.

References 

Rural localities in Kudymkarsky District